Garfield County is a county in the U.S. state of Nebraska. As of the 2010 United States Census, the population was 2,049. Its county seat is Burwell. The county was organized in 1884; it was named for James A. Garfield, 20th President of the United States.

In the Nebraska license plate system, Garfield County is represented by the prefix 83 (it had the 83rd-largest number of vehicles registered in the county when the license plate system was established in 1922).

Geography
The North Loup River runs through the southwest corner of Garfield County.

Major highways

  Nebraska Highway 11
  Nebraska Highway 70
  Nebraska Highway 91
  Nebraska Highway 96

Adjacent counties

 Wheeler County – east
 Valley County – south
 Custer County – southwest
 Loup County – west
 Holt County – north

Protected areas
 Calamus Reservoir State Park (partial)
 Mirdan Canal State Wildlife Management Area

Demographics

As of the 2000 United States Census, there were 1,902 people, 813 households, and 529 families in the county. The population density was 3 people per square mile (1/km2).  There were 1,021 housing units at an average density of 2 per square mile (1/km2). The racial makeup of the county was 98.79% White, 0.21% Native American, 0.05% Asian, 0.05% Pacific Islander, 0.37% from other races, and 0.53% from two or more races. 1.00% of the population were Hispanic or Latino of any race.

There were 813 households, out of which 26.10% had children under the age of 18 living with them, 59.70% were married couples living together, 3.60% had a female householder with no husband present, and 34.90% were non-families. 32.70% of all households were made up of individuals, and 20.00% had someone living alone who was 65 years of age or older.  The average household size was 2.27 and the average family size was 2.88.

The county population contained 23.50% under the age of 18, 4.40% from 18 to 24, 20.50% from 25 to 44, 26.80% from 45 to 64, and 24.80% who were 65 years of age or older. The median age was 46 years. For every 100 females there were 91.90 males. For every 100 females age 18 and over, there were 85.40 males.

The median income for a household in the county was $27,407, and the median income for a family was $34,762. Males had a median income of $24,563 versus $16,146 for females. The per capita income for the county was $14,368. About 9.70% of families and 12.60% of the population were below the poverty line, including 11.50% of those under age 18 and 18.60% of those age 65 or over.

Communities

City 
 Burwell (county seat)

Unincorporated communities 
 Deverre
 Erina
 Gables pop: 16
 Darenn

Politics
Garfield County voters are reliably Republican. In only one national election since 1916 has the county selected the Democratic Party nominee.

See also
 National Register of Historic Places listings in Garfield County, Nebraska

References

 
Nebraska counties
States and territories established in 1884
1884 establishments in Nebraska